James Kenneth Gray O.C., A.O.E. was born in Kirkland Lake, Ontario in 1933. He was educated at Ridley College in St. Catharines, Canada.  He came to Calgary in 1956 to pursue a career in Alberta's energy sector. In 1973, he co-founded Canadian Hunter Exploration, an organization that became one of Canada's largest and most successful natural gas companies."

Gray has served as an independent director of Brookfield Asset Management (an NYSE listed company) since April 1997. He is also a director emeritus of Canadian National Railway, director of Phoenix Technology Services, and Honorary Chair of the Canada West Foundation.

In 2019, Gray joined the Ad Hoc Committee of Calgary Citizens, which requested that Calgary's Green Line transit project be paused.

Gray was recognized in 2002 with the Alberta Order of Excellence.

References

External links 
 

Businesspeople from Calgary
1933 births
Living people
People from Kirkland Lake
Members of the Alberta Order of Excellence